Ostrya japonica, known as East Asian hophornbeam, or Japanese hop-hornbeam, is a species of tree in the Betulaceae family growing to 25 m tall. It is native to Japan, Korea and China. In Japan it is known as Asada (浅田).

References

Further reading
 Ohwi, J. Flora of Japan, 1984. 
 Woody Plants of Japan, Vol. 1, 2000. 

japonica
Trees of China
Trees of Japan
Trees of Korea